Hardinge County is one of the 141 Cadastral divisions of New South Wales.

Hardinge County was named in honour of Field Marshal, Sir Henry Hardinge (1785-1856.

Parishes 
A full list of parishes found within this county; their current LGA and mapping coordinates to the approximate centre of each location is as follows:

References

Counties of New South Wales